In Magic: The Gathering, Power Nine is a set of nine cards that were printed in the game's early core sets, consisting of Black Lotus, Ancestral Recall, Time Walk, Mox Pearl, Mox Sapphire, Mox Jet, Mox Ruby, Mox Emerald, and Timetwister.

The Power Nine are considered to be among the most powerful cards in the game. All nine cards were printed only in the Alpha, Beta, and Unlimited sets in late 1993 and early 1994. They were of the highest rarity in each set they appeared in. A total number of 22,800 copies of each card were printed (not counting promotional releases). Currently, all of the Power Nine cards are restricted in the Vintage tournament format and banned in Legacy, the only tournament formats where they would be legal otherwise, and all except for Timetwister are banned in the Commander format.

Cards

Black Lotus

The "Black Lotus" card can be played at zero cost, and grants three mana (the game's primary resource) when sacrificed (discarded from play). Thus, the card gives the player an enormous jump in the early stages of a Magic game. Former Pro player and Magic writer Zvi Mowshowitz has declared Black Lotus as the best card of its type of all time, claiming every deck in the history of the game is better with a Black Lotus in it. It has since been banned from all official tournament formats save for Vintage, but even there, it is limited to one copy per deck, compared to the normal allowance of four.

The reason this powerful card is a flower is attributed to Richard Garfield liking the idea of a lot of power being contained in a flower, a transient object in contrast to more permanent objects like rings or amulets that are often depicted as sources of power in other fantasy settings.

Black Lotus is usually considered to be the most valuable non-promotional Magic card ever printed. Its Alpha and Beta versions in particular are considered to be extremely valuable, due to the more limited print runs and black borders of those sets. The Alpha version of Black Lotus is the rarest and most sought-after, with an estimated 1100 ever printed, followed by the Beta version, with 3300 ever printed. Although Black Lotus was highly-sought after early on it took a while for it to become the consensus most valuable card in the game. The first Scrye price guide from June 1994 still lists the Alpha Shivan Dragon as the most valuable card in the game at $22 to Black Lotus's $15.

Moxes
The five original Mox cards are: 
Mox Pearl
Mox Sapphire
Mox Jet
Mox Ruby
Mox Emerald
They are colloquially known as "Moxen" or "Moxes". They are similar to the five Basic Lands (the cards that provide the primary resource to play most cards) in that they cost nothing to play and can add one mana of a specific color to their owner's resource pool. Unlike lands, however, more than one can be played per turn. Like Black Lotus, this can lead to extremely powerful plays much earlier than normal. All five Mox cards were illustrated by Dan Frazier. In each artwork, a different piece of jewelry is depicted. The word Mox is derived from Moxie, slang for courage, or as Richard Garfield interpreted it, energy. However, not all of the people involved with the creation of Magic may have known that fact: when Frazier asked art director Jesper Myrfors what a Mox was, he replied "Oh, we don’t know!"

Ancestral Recall
Ancestral Recall allows the player to draw three cards at an extremely low cost. It originated as part of a set of five cards known as "Boons", one of each color, which gave three of something (e.g. mana, life, damage) for the cost of one mana. Ancestral Recall is the only rare Boon and the only one not to have been reprinted since the Unlimited set.

Time Walk

For a very low cost, Time Walk allows a player to take an extra turn. In a game that involves a constant build-up of resources over time, a full turn's additional development turned out to be far more powerful than Magic's early designers had imagined. Several cards that grant additional turns have been printed since Time Walk, but always at a much greater cost.

In Time Walk's early development version, it originally had the text "Target player loses next turn."  Richard Garfield tells an anecdote about a playtester telling him that he had a card in his deck that would guarantee he would win the game on the next turn. Garfield could not figure out which card this could be, until the playtester showed him a Time Walk, and pointed out that the phrasing on this card was ambiguous, and it could also be interpreted as saying that another player was forced to lose the game. The wording was changed prior to the release of the game.

Timetwister
While the other Power Nine cards are simple in concept, Timetwister is more complex. It forces each player to shuffle their hand, graveyard, and library together and then draw a new hand of seven cards. Because it affects all players, it may not be apparent at first why Timetwister is a powerful card. Its power lies mostly in situations where the player playing it has fewer cards in his or her hand than the opponent, and has established a powerful board position—Timetwister does not affect cards in play. The player casting Timetwister can essentially catch up on cards in hand, and potentially get back powerful cards that were discarded, without giving up a dominant board position. Unlike the other cards in the Power Nine, Timetwister therefore requires a deck to be more carefully built in order to exploit its power.

Magic Online 
The Power Nine were not available for the first twelve years of Magic Online. They first appeared as a part of Cube Drafts, where players do not keep the cards for their collections after the conclusion of the event. In June 2014, Wizards of the Coast officially supported Vintage as a Magic Online sanctioned format, and Vintage Masters, a booster specifically providing essential parts of the Vintage format, including all Power Nine cards, was released for a limited period. The Power Nine cards appeared only in the premium foil slots of Vintage Masters boosters where they could be either foil or non-foil as a special rarity. On average it took 53 packs of Vintage Masters to open one piece of the Power Nine.

The implementation of the Power Nine cards online is functionally identical to the original cards, but the cards are displayed with updated rules text. The versions originally released online feature different artwork and are displayed with a modern card frame. With exception of the Black Lotus, the illustrations are those that were originally given to the winners of the Vintage Championships as alternate Power Nine artworks. The Black Lotus received a new artwork by Chris Rahn.

In December 2017 Vintage Masters drafts were reintroduced to Magic Online for a week (beginning 12 December and ending 19 December). In this case players could choose between two types of boosters, the classic Vintage Masters boosters and otherwise identical boosters that included Power Nine with the cards' original arts and borders.

MTG Arena 
Though some of the cards had appeared in earlier one-off events, the full power nine were introduced into arena with the October 2022 Alchemy update via the card Oracle of the Alpha. When Oracle of the Alpha, a creature, enters the battlefield, you "conjure the Power Nine into your library, then shuffle."

Alternate versions

Parodies

The Blacker Lotus was a satirical card in the parody Unglued set which produced four mana, although it required the user to physically tear the card up before use. Jack-in-the-Mox from the same set works like a regular Mox but produces either a random color of mana, or destroys itself, depending on a die roll. Mox Lotus, from the later Unhinged parody set, provides infinite mana of any color and immunity to mana-burn (now redundant due to rules changes), but costs fifteen mana to play.

Cards in homage to the Power Nine 

The beloved nature of the Power Nine within the game has occasionally motivated Wizards to create cards that are similar in name and effect to these cards. For example homages to Black Lotus usually have "Lotus" in their name and produce three mana of a single color in most cases as a one-shot effect. Despite Wizards attempts to better balance the power level of cards evoking the original Power Nine in many cases these cards have proven to be of an extremely high power level themselves. As an example Mox Opal, an artifact which can be tapped for any mana, similar to the original Moxes, but only if you control at least three artifacts, has been considered one of the most powerful cards in Modern for a long time and was eventually banned from the format for being too powerful.

Alternate art

The Power Nine are among the very few widely recognized cards never to have received updated artwork from their original printing. As a way to rectify this, since 2003, the winner of the annual Vintage Championship has received a unique, oversized Power Nine card featuring brand-new art. These prize cards are considerably larger than actual cards, and therefore cannot be used in play. The five Mox cards feature artwork that represent the settings of the Magic expansions released in their corresponding years. Their artist, Volkan Baga, has also illustrated two other Mox cards—Mox Opal and the reissued Mox Diamond—in the same style. The following cards have been given to the winners:

 2003: Black Lotus to Carl Winter (Artwork by Christopher Rush)
 2004: Timetwister to Mark Biller (Artwork by Mark Tedin)
 2005: Ancestral Recall to Roland Chang (Artwork by Mark Poole)
 2006: Mox Pearl to Travis Spero (Artwork by Volkan Baga)
 2007: Mox Jet to Stephen Menendian (Artwork by Volkan Baga)
 2008: Mox Ruby to Paul Mastriano (Artwork by Volkan Baga)
 2009: Mox Emerald to Itou Hiromichi (Artwork by Volkan Baga)
 2010: Mox Sapphire to Owen Turtenwald (Artwork by Volkan Baga)
 2011: Time Walk to Mark Hornung (Artwork by Chris Rahn)
 2012: Timetwister to Marc Lanigra (Artwork by Matt Stewart)
 2013: Ancestral Recall to Joel Lim (Artwork by Ryan Pancoast)
 2014: Mox Pearl to Mark Tocco (Artwork by Raoul Vitale)
 2015: Mox Emerald to Brian Kelly (Artwork by Raoul Vitale)
 2016: Mox Sapphire to Joseph Bogaard (Artwork by Raoul Vitale)
 2016 EU: Mox Jet to Joan Anton Mateo (Artwork by Raoul Vitale)
 2017 EU: Mox Ruby to Joaquín Solís (Artwork by Raoul Vitale)

References

External links
 "The Power Nine"—Images of all Power Nine cards
 "Magic Rarities—Images of the alternate art versions
 The Gatherer Card Database—This database has detailed information on all other cards mentioned in this article

Magic: The Gathering